The Simon Kenton Council (#441) is a Boy Scouts of America council created in 1994 that serves members of the Cub Scouts, Scouts BSA, Venturing, Exploring and in-school programs in central and southern Ohio, and northern Kentucky.  The council is divided into five districts with headquarters in Columbus, Ohio. Simon Kenton Council is named for frontiersman Simon Kenton.

Organization
The Council serves over 17,674 youth across its five key programs. Simon Kenton Council is divided into five districts: 
Daybreak District - Eastern portion of the Council
Frontier District - Southern portion of the Council
Gateway District - Western portion of the Council
Polaris District - Northern portion of the Council
Central District - Central portion of the Council

History
In 1917, the Marietta Council (#464) was formed, changing its name to the Washington County Council (#464) in 1922. Washington County Council  changed names to Southeastern Ohio Council (#464) in 1923. In 1942, the Southeastern Ohio Council (#464) was divided, with part going to the Kootaga Area Council (#618) and part becoming the Chief Logan Council (#464). In 1919, the Newark Council (#451) was formed, changing its name to the Licking County Council (#451) in 1922. In 1915, the Portsmouth Council (#457) was formed, changing its name to the Scioto County Council (#457) in 1923. In 1931 Scioto County Council changed its name to the Scioto Area Council (#457). In 1921, the Chillicothe Council (#437) was formed, merging into the Columbus Council (#441) in 1929. In 1922, the Fairfield County Council (#445) was formed, merging into the Columbus Council (#441) in 1929. In 1923, the Lawrence County Council (#450) was formed, merging into the Scioto County Council (#457) in 1929. In 1919, the Pickaway County Council was formed, merging into the Columbus Council (#441) in 1929. In 1910, the Columbus Council was formed, changing its name to the Central Ohio Council (#441) in 1930. In 1922, the Licking County Council (#451) was formed, merging into the Central Ohio Council (#441) in 1987. In 1994, the Simon Kenton Council (#441) was formed from the merger of the Central Ohio Council (#441), Chief Logan Council (#464), and Scioto Area Council (#457).

Camps
Simon Kenton Council operates four camps.  Camp Lazarus, located in Delaware, Ohio, is the home of the summer Cub Scout resident camp.  Camp Falling Rock, located in Newark, Ohio, feature Scouts BSA summer camp.  Camp Oyo, located in Friendship, Ohio, celebrated its 90th Anniversary in 2016.  Each camp also hosts numerous activities throughout the year.  Camp Otter Run, located in Marysville, Ohio is a smaller camp.

Programs and activities

Scouts BSA
There are many programs in Simon Kenton Council.  Each year there are approximately 300 new Eagle Scouts.

Venturing
Simon Kenton Council is one of the 7 councils to earn the 2007 Central Region Venturing Standards of Excellence Award.  It has had a Venturing Officers Association since 2000.  Its Officers have gone on to serve at many Regional and Area Leadership roles.   Annually it provides many events for Venturers such as:
 Venturing Arctic Weekend (VAW)
 Venturing Midnight Ski Extravaganza
 Wilderness First Aid Training Weekend
 Venturing C.U.P. (Challenge 'Ur Peers)
 Silver V
 Camp Oyo High Adventure Camp
 Sea Scout Rendezvous
 Project Save Our American Resources (SOAR)
 Annual Venturing Banquet

Sea Scouting
Simon Kenton Council has had an interesting history as the Council only has rivers and lakes for water.  Sea Scouting has only existed before World War II and after the 21st Century.   There were never any Sea Explorers in this Council but there have been twelve Quartermasters. 
 Robert Caldwell - 1935
 William Hahn - 1935
 Vann D. Smith - 1935
 Nye Scofield - 1938
 Rex Landis - 1938
 Lindsay Lockhart - 2003
 Nathan Cheesman - 2003
 Clinton Uhrig - 2004
 Melissa Nazareth - 2005
 Michael Lockhart - 2006
 Kevin Tschantz  - 2006
 Ted Autore - 2017
 Benjamin Bratton - 2021

Tecumseh Lodge

The council is served by the Tecumseh Lodge (#65) of the Order of the Arrow, the Boy Scouting program's national honor society. It is part of Section E13 in the OA's Eastern Region and participates in its conclave each year. Its chapters are:
 Kìshahtèk - North District

 Kittan Wewoapisak - South District

 Ahsënike - East District

 Pilsit Alunsa - West District

See also
 Scouting in Ohio

References

External links

Local councils of the Boy Scouts of America
Youth organizations based in Ohio
Central Region (Boy Scouts of America)
1994 establishments in Ohio